Diana was launched in 1799 at Topsham as a West Indiaman. She was wrecked in 1802.

Career
She was first listed in Lloyd's Register (LR)  in 1799.

Fate
Diana was wrecked in 1802.

As  was returning to England from Jamaica, on 23 June 1802 she sighted a large vessel wrecked on the west end of the Isle of Pines. A sloop from the Grand Caymanes reported that the wrecked vessel was Diana, Williams, master, which had been sailing from Jamaica to Liverpool. A wrecker had visited Diana and salvaged 100 pipes of Madeira wine, which she had taken to Caymanes. Captain Williams had died after leaving Jamaica.

Citations

1799 ships
Age of Sail merchant ships of England
Maritime incidents in 1802
Ships built on the River Exe